Hillulah may refer to:
 Yom Hillula (day of festivity), a Jewish celebration of the life of a great tzaddik on the anniversary of his death. 
 Hillulah, an EP recording released by the band Gang Gang Dance